The Nicolaus Copernicus Astronomical Center (Polish: Centrum Astronomiczne im. Mikołaja Kopernika) is a Polish scientific research institute of the Polish Academy of Sciences headquartered in Warsaw, Poland. It is a leading institution in the country in the field of astronomy.

History 

In the '50s, the Polish Academy of Sciences  started to plan a new center for astronomers from all over Poland. However, the administration decided to withdraw from the project a few years later: the project was never funded. At the beginning of the '70s, a group of Polish astronomers proposed a new initiative. During an assembly of the Polish Academy of Sciences, professors Bohdan Paczyński and Józef Smak presented a project for a theoretical astrophysics institute, in order to overcome problems due to the high prize of building a telescope. 

In May 1971 the US National Academy of Sciences sent its envoy  to Poland from Yerkes Observatory. The American envoy talked with many representatives of the Polish astronomical community, until a more precise idea of CAMK finally emerged. The idea was well received by the US National Academy of Sciences. Moreover, the US could provide substantial financial support for the construction of CAMK. In fact, at that time, there were nearly $351 mil. Polish zlotys in US-owned funds, the so-called "wheat money". This amount of Polish zloty accumulated as the result of the agricultural sales of the United States to Poland after the second world war. At that time, zlotys could not be converted into any other currency, meaning that they could not be counted in the domestic US federal budget. Therefore, it was convenient for both the United States, as well as for Poland, to build CAMK with those funds. In this way, part of the Polish "wheat debt" with the US could be cancelled, at no cost in dollars for the US government.  

The CAMK centre was then built in Siekierki, that at that time was a rather poor neighborhood of Warsaw. The main road of Siekierki, ulica Bartycka, was also built at that time to connect the institute with the rest of the city. This new building was inaugurated on May 24th, 1978. Next year, CAMK was licensed to award PhD degrees. Since then, CAMK maintains its own hotel for visitors and manages funds to support PhD students and provide research fellowships for more senior scientists.  

In 1981, the martial law was declared in Poland in order to suppress the Solidarity movement. In this period, many CAMK employees chose permanent emigration. With their presence abroad, they were providing journals for the library, spare parts for the ageing computer system, and money for postdocs and short-term visitors. In fact, during the marital-law, the right to travel abroad was restricted, making research and collaborations difficult. Some CAMK scientists were even jailed for their pro-Solidarity activities.  

Bans and restrictions were ultimately lifted in 1989, with the end of the so-called Polish People's Republic: Polish astronomy and CAMK started to grow and gain more international relevance. With the advent of internet in Poland, CAMK was one of the first places in Poland to connect to the world-wide-web: the early parabola used for the internet connection in the early '90s is still visible in the CAMK's front garden from ulica Bartycka.

Description 

The main subjects of research include: stellar evolution, binary stars, asteroseismology, circumstellar matter, compact objects (neutron stars, black holes), accretion processes, structure and evolution of active galaxies, cosmology and extrasolar planets. In 2020 CAMK employed 69 researchers.

The CAMK center has also a Department of Astrophysics in Toruń, a Polish city famous for being Nicolaus Copernicus's hometown and its medieval old town.

References 

Astronomy institutes and departments
Institutes of the Polish Academy of Sciences
Organizations established in 1976
1976 establishments in Poland